Kalkrand is a village in the Hardap Region of southern central Namibia. It is situated between Rehoboth and Mariental on the national road B1. The village features a petrol station, schools, a police station and a public clinic. The inhabitants mainly live from small livestock and cattle farming.

Politics

Kalkrand is governed by a village council that has five seats.

The 2015 local authority election was won by the SWAPO party which gained four seats (399 votes). The remaining seat went to the Rally for Democracy and Progress (RDP) which obtained 121 votes). The 2020 local authority election was won by the newly formed Landless People's Movement (LPM) which scored well all over Hardap. LPM gained 312 votes and two seats, followed by SWAPO, also with two seats (234 votes). The likewise new Independent Patriots for Change (IPC) won 97 votes and the remaining village council seat.

References

Populated places in the Hardap Region
Villages in Namibia